Kandeh Qulan-e Sofla (also Romanized as Kandeh Qūlān-e Soflá; also known as Kandeh Qūlān-e Pā'īn) is a village in Lahijan Rural District, in the Central District of Piranshahr County, West Azerbaijan Province, Iran. At the 2006 census, its population was 55, in 9 families.

References 

Populated places in Piranshahr County